The Q-code is a standardised collection of three-letter codes that each start with the letter "Q". It is an operating signal initially developed for commercial radiotelegraph communication and later adopted by other radio services, especially amateur radio. To distinguish the use of a Q-code transmitted as a question from the same Q-code transmitted as a statement, operators either prefixed it with the military network question marker "" (dit dit dah dit dah) or suffixed it with the standard Morse question mark  (dit dit dah dah dit dit).

Although Q-codes were created when radio used Morse code exclusively, they continued to be employed after the introduction of voice transmissions. To avoid confusion, transmitter call signs are restricted; no country is ever issued an ITU prefix starting with "Q".

Codes in the range QAA–QNZ are reserved for aeronautical use; QOA–QQZ for maritime use and QRA–QUZ for all services.

"Q" has no official meaning, but it is sometimes assigned a word with mnemonic value, such as "Queen" for example in QFE: Queen's field elevation, or "Query", "Question", "reQuest".

Early development
The original Q-codes were created, circa 1909, by the British government as a "List of abbreviations ... prepared for the use of British ships and coast stations licensed by the Postmaster General". The Q-codes facilitated communication between maritime radio operators speaking different languages, so they were soon adopted internationally. A total of forty-five Q-codes appeared in the "List of Abbreviations to be used in Radio Communications", which was included in the Service Regulations affixed to the Second International Radiotelegraph Convention in London (The Convention was signed on July 5, 1912, and became effective July 1, 1913.)

The following table reviews a sample of the all-services Q-codes adopted by the 1912 convention:

Later use
Over the years the original Q-codes were modified to reflect changes in radio practice. For example, QSW / QSX originally stood for, "Shall I increase / decrease my spark frequency?", but in the 1920s spark-gap transmitters were gradually being banned from land stations, making that meaning obsolete. By the 1970s, the Post Office Handbook for Radio Operators listed over a hundred Q-codes, covering a wide range of subjects including radio procedures, meteorology, radio direction finding, and search and rescue.

Some Q-codes are also used in aviation, in particular QNE, QNH and QFE, referring to certain altimeter settings. These codes are used in radiotelephone conversations with air traffic control as unambiguous shorthand, where safety and efficiency are of vital importance. A subset of Q-codes is used by the Miami-Dade County, Florida local government for law enforcement and fire rescue communications, one of the few instances where Q-codes are used in ground voice communication.

The QAA–QNZ code range includes phrases applicable primarily to the aeronautical service, as defined by the International Civil Aviation Organization. The QOA–QQZ code range is reserved for the maritime service.  The QRA–QUZ code range includes phrases applicable to all services and is allocated to the International Telecommunication Union. QVA–QZZ are not allocated. Many codes have no immediate applicability outside one individual service, such as maritime operation (many QO or QU series codes) or radioteletype operation (the QJ series).

Many military and other organisations that use Morse code have adopted additional codes, including the Z code used by most European and NATO countries. The Z code adds commands and questions adapted for military radio transmissions, for example, "ZBW 2", which means "change to backup frequency number 2", and "ZNB abc", which means "my checksum is abc, what is yours?"

Used in their formal question / answer sense, the meaning of a Q-code varies depending on whether the individual Q-code is sent as a question or an answer. For example, the message "QRP?" means "Shall I decrease transmitter power?", and a reply of "QRP" means "Yes, decrease your transmitter power", whereas an unprompted statement "QRP" means "Please decrease your transmitter power". This structured use of Q-codes is fairly rare and now mainly limited to amateur radio and military Morse code (CW) traffic networks.

Breakdown by service
QAA to QNZ – Assigned by the International Civil Aviation Organization (ICAO).
QNA to QNZ – The American Radio Relay League (ARRL) has also developed its own QN Signals for message handling located in this range. Even though they overlap with other signals, the ARRL determined that their exclusive use in NTS nets limits confusion.
QOA to QQZ – For the Maritime Mobile Service.
QRA to QUZ – Assigned by the International Telecommunication Union Radiocommunication Sector (ITU-R).

Aeronautical Code signals (QAA–QNZ; ICAO)

First defined in ICAO publication "Doc 6100-COM/504/1" and in "ICAO Procedures for Air Navigation Services, Abbreviations and Codes (PANS-ABC)" [Doc8400-4] (4th edition 1989), the majority of the Q-codes have fallen out of common use; for example today reports such as QAU ("I am about to jettison fuel") and QAZ ("I am flying in a storm") would be voice or computerised transmissions. But several remain part of the standard ICAO radiotelephony phraseology in aviation. These are also part of ACP131, which lists all ITU-R Q-codes, without grouping them by aeronautical/marine/general use.

Maritime Mobile Service (QOA–QQZ)

This assignment is specified in RECOMMENDATION ITU-R M.1172.

Q signals are not substantially used in the maritime service. Morse code is now very rarely used for maritime communications, but in isolated maritime regions like Antarctica and the South Pacific the use of Q-codes continues. Q-codes still work when HF voice circuits are not possible due to atmospherics and the nearest vessel is one ionospheric hop away.

 
{|
  |-
  | 0. Dutch   || 5. Italian
  |-
  | 1. English || 6. Japanese
  |-
  | 2. French  || 7. Norwegian
  |-
  | 3. German   || 8. Russian
  |-
  | 4. Greek   || 9. Spanish
  |} 
|-
|QOE 
|-
|QOF 
|What is the commercial quality of my signals? 
|-
|QOG 
|How many tapes have you to send? 
|I have  tapes to send. 
|-
|QOH 
|Shall I send a phasing signal for  seconds? 
|Send a phasing signal for  seconds. 
|-
|QOI 
|Shall I send my tape? 
|Send your tape. 
|-
|QOJ 
|Will you listen on  kHz (or MHz) for signals of emergency position-indicating radiobeacons? 
|I am listening on  kHz (or MHz) for signals of emergency position-indicating radiobeacons. 
|-
|QOK 
|Have you received the signals of an emergency position-indicating radiobeacon on  kHz (or MHz)? 
|I have received the signals of an emergency position-indicating radiobeacon on  kHz (or MHz). 
|-
|QOL 
|Is your vessel fitted for reception of selective calls? If so, what is your selective call number or signal? 
|My vessel is fitted for the reception of selective calls.
|-
|QOM 
|On what frequencies can your vessel be reached by a selective call? 
|My vessel can be reached by a selective call on the following frequency/ies  (periods of time to be added if necessary). 
|-
|QOO 
|Can you send on any working frequency? 
|I can send on any working frequency. 
|-
|QOT 
|Do you hear my call; what is the approximate delay in minutes before we may exchange traffic? 
|I hear your call; the approximate delay is  minutes. 
|}

All services (QRA–QUZ)
First defined by the Washington 1927 ITU Radio Regulations. Later defined by ITU-R in Appendix 9 to the Radio Regulations Annex to the International Telecommunications Convention (Atlantic City, 1947). The current callsign table is found in ITU-R Appendix 42. Current interpretation of the Q-code can be found in ITU-R Appendices 14 and 15.

ITU Radio Regulations 1990, Appendix 13: Miscellaneous Abbreviations and Signals to be Used in Radiotelegraphy Communications Except in the Maritime Mobile Service:
                                                                                                                                                                                                                

|-
|QRJ 
|How many radiotelephone calls have you to book? 
|I have  radiotelephone calls to book. 
|-
|QRK 
|What is the intelligibility of my signals (or those of )? 
|The intelligibility of your signals (or those of ) is 
{|
  |-
  | 1. bad
  |-
  | 2. poor
  |-
  | 3. fair
  |-
  | 4. good
  |-
  | 5. excellent
  |}
|-
|QRL 
|Are you busy? 
|I am busy (or I am busy with ). Please do not interfere. 
|-
|QRM 
|Are you being interfered with? 
or Is my transmission being interfered with? 
|I am being interfered with 
{|
  |-
  | 1. nil
  |-
  | 2. slightly
  |-
  | 3. moderately
  |-
  | 4. severely
  |-
  | 5. extremely
  |}
|-
|QRN 
|Are you troubled by static? 
|I am troubled by static.
{|
  |-
  | 1. nil
  |-
  | 2. slightly
  |-
  | 3. moderately
  |-
  | 4. severely
  |-
  | 5. extremely
  |}
|-
|QRO 
|Shall I increase transmitter power? 
|Increase transmitter power. 
|-
|QRP 
|Shall I decrease transmitter power? 
|Decrease transmitter power. 
|-
|QRQ 
|Shall I send faster? 
|Send faster ( words per minute). 
|-
|QRR 
|Are you ready for automatic operation? 
|I am ready for automatic operation. Send at  words per minute. 
|-
|QRS 
|Shall I send more slowly? 
|Send more slowly ( words per minute). 
|-
|QRT 
|Shall I stop sending? 
|Stop sending. 
|-
|QRU 
|Have you anything for me? 
|I have nothing for you. 
|-
|QRV 
|Are you ready? 
|I am ready. 
|-
|QRW 
|Shall I inform  that you are calling him on  kHz (or MHz)? 
|Please inform  that I am calling him on  kHz (or MHz). 
|-
|QRX 
|When will you call me again? 
|I will call you again at  hours (on  kHz (or MHz)). 
|-
|QRY 
|What is my turn? (Relates to communication). 
|Your turn is Number  (or according to any other indication). (Relates to communication). 
|-
|QRZ 
|Who is calling me? 
|-
|QSA 
|What is the strength of my signals (or those of )? 
{|
  |-
  | 1. scarcely perceptible
  |-
  | 2. weak
  |-
  | 3. fairly good
  |-
  | 4. good
  |-
  | 5. very good
  |}  
|-
|QSB 
|Are my signals fading? 
|Your signals are fading. 
|-
|QSC 
|Are you a cargo vessel? 
or Are you a low traffic ship? 
|I am a cargo vessel. 
or I am a low traffic ship. 
|-
|QSD 
|Is my keying defective? 
or Are my signals mutilated? 
|Your keying is defective. 
or Your signals are mutilated.
|-
|QSE*
|What is the estimated drift of the survival craft? 
|-
|QSF*
|Have you effected rescue? 
|I have effected rescue and am proceeding to  base (with  persons injured requiring ambulance). 
|-
|QSG 
|Shall I send  telegrams at a time? 
|Send  telegrams at a time. 
|-
|QSH 
|Are you able to home on your direction-finding equipment? 
|I am able to home on my D/F equipment (on station ). 
|-
|QSI 
| 
|I have been unable to break in on your transmission. 
or Will you inform  (call sign) that I have been unable to break in on his transmission (on  kHz (or MHz)).       
|-
|QSJ 
|What is the charge to be collected to  including your internal charge? 
|The charge to be collected to  including my internal charge is  francs. 
|-
|QSK 
|Can you hear me between your signals and if so can I break in on your transmission? 
|I can hear you between my signals; break in on my transmission. 
|-
|QSL 
|Can you acknowledge receipt? 
|I am acknowledging receipt. 
|-
|QSM 
|Shall I repeat the last telegram which I sent you (or some previous telegram)? 
|Repeat the last telegram which you sent me (or telegram(s) number(s) ). 
|-
|QSN 
|-
|QSO 
|Can you communicate with  direct (or by relay)? 
|I can communicate with  direct (or by relay through ). 
|-
|QSP 
|Will you relay to  free of charge? 
|I will relay to  free of charge. 
|-
|QSQ 
|-
|QSR 
|Shall I repeat the call on the calling frequency? 
|Repeat your call on the calling frequency; did not hear you (or have interference). 
|-
|QSS 
|What working frequency will you use? 
|I will use the working frequency  kHz (or MHz) (in the HF bands normally only the last three figures of the frequency need be given). 
|-
|QSU 
|Shall I send or reply on this frequency (or on  kHz (or MHz)) (with emissions of class )? 
|Send or reply on this frequency (or on  kHz (or MHz)) (with emissions of class ). 
|-
|QSV 
|Shall I send a series of Vs on this frequency (or on  kHz (or MHz))? 
|Send a series of Vs on this frequency (or on  kHz (or MHz)). 
|-
|QSW 
|Will you send on this frequency (or on  kHz (or MHz)) (with emissions of class )? 
|I am going to send on this frequency (or on  kHz (or MHz)) (with emissions of class ). 
|-
|QSX 
|-
|QSY 
|Should I change to transmission on another frequency? If so what one?
|Change to transmission on another frequency [or on  kHz (or MHz)]. 
|-
|QSZ 
|Shall I send each word or group more than once? 
|Send each word or group twice (or  times). 
|-
|QTA 
|Shall I cancel telegram (or message) number  ?
|Cancel telegram (or message) number .
|-
|QTB 
|Do you agree with my counting of words? 
|I do not agree with your counting of words; I will repeat the first letter or digit of each word or group. 
|-
|QTC 
|How many telegrams have you to send? 
|I have  telegrams for you (or for ). 
|-
|QTD*
|What has the rescue vessel or rescue aircraft recovered? 
| (identification) has recovered .
{|
  |-
  | 1.  (number) survivors
  |-
  | 2. wreckage
  |-
  | 3.  (number) bodies
  |} 
|-
|QTE 
|What is my TRUE bearing from you? 
|Your TRUE bearing from me is  degrees at  hours. 
|-
|QTF 
|Will you give me the position of my station according to the bearings taken by the direction-finding stations which you control? 
|The position of your station according to the bearings taken by the D/F stations which I control was  latitude,  longitude (or other indication of position), class  at  hours.  
|-
|QTG 
|Will you send two dashes of ten seconds each followed by your call sign (repeated  times) (on  kHz (or MHz))? 
or Will you request  to send two dashes of ten seconds followed by his call sign (repeated         times) on  kHz (or MHz)?         
|I am going to send two dashes of ten seconds each followed by my call sign (repeated  times) (on  kHz (or MHz)). 
or I have requested  to send two dashes of ten seconds followed  by his call sign (repeated         times) on  kHz (or MHz).        
|-
|QTH 
|What is your position in latitude and longitude (or according to any other indication)? 
|My position is  latitude,  longitude (or according to any other indication). 
|-
|QTI 
|What is your TRUE track?
|My TRUE track is  degrees. 
|-
|QTI*
|What is your TRUE course? 
|My TRUE course is  degrees. 
|-
|QTJ*
|What is your speed? 
(Requests the speed of a ship or aircraft through the water or air respectively). 
|My speed is  knots (or  kilometres per hour or  statute miles per hour). 
(Indicates the speed of a ship or aircraft through the water or air respectively). 
|-
|QTK*
|What is the speed of your aircraft in relation to the surface of the Earth? 
|The speed of my aircraft in relation to the surface of the Earth is  knots (or  kilometres per hour or  statute miles per hour). 
|-
|QTL*
|What is your TRUE heading? 
|My TRUE heading is  degrees. 
|-
|QTM*
|What is your MAGNETIC heading? 
|My MAGNETIC heading is  degrees. 
|-
|QTN 
|-
|QTO 
|Have you left dock (or port)? 
or Are you airborne? 
|I have left dock (or port). 
or I am airborne. 
|-
|QTP 
|Are you going to enter dock (or port)? 
or Are you going to alight (or land)? 
|I am going to enter dock (or port). 
or I am going to alight (or land). 
|-
|QTQ 
|Can you communicate with my station by means of the International Code of Signals (INTERCO)? 
|I am going to communicate with your station by means of the International Code of Signals (INTERCO). 
|-
|QTR 
|What is the correct time? 
|The correct time is  hours. 
|-
|QTS 
|Will you send your call sign for tuning purposes or so that your frequency can be measured now (or at  hours) on  kHz (or MHz)? 
or Will you send your call sign (and/or name) for  seconds? 
|I will send my call sign for tuning purposes or so that my frequency may be measured now (or at  hours) on  kHz (or MHz). 
or I will send my call sign (and/or name) for  seconds. 
|-
|QTT 
| 
|The identification signal which follows is superimposed on another transmission. 
|-
|QTU 
|What are the hours during which your station is open? 
|-
|QTV 
|-
|QTW*
|What is the condition of survivors? 
|Survivors are in  condition and urgently need .
|-
|QTX 
|Will you keep your station open for further communication with me until further notice (or until  hours)? 
|I will keep my station open for further communication with you until further notice (or until  hours). 
|-
|QTY*
|Are you proceeding to the position of incident and if so when do you expect to arrive? 
|-
|QTZ*
|Are you continuing the search? 
|-
|QUA 
|-
|QUB*
|Here is the information requested:  (The units used for speed and distances should be indicated.) 
|-
|QUC 
|-
|QUD 
|-
|QUE 
|-
|QUF 
|-
|QUG 
|Will you be forced to alight (or land)? 
|I am forced to alight (or land) immediately. 
|-
|QUH*
|Will you give me the present barometric pressure at sea level? 
|-
|QUI 
|Are your navigation lights working?
|My navigation lights are working.
|-
|QUJ 
|Will you indicate the TRUE track to reach you (or )? 
|The TRUE track to reach me (or ) is  degrees at  hours. 
|-
|QUK 
|-
|QUL 
|-
|QUM 
|May I resume normal working? 
|Normal working may be resumed. 
|-
|QUN 
|1. When directed to all stations:
Will vessels
 (in my immediate vicinity )
or
 (in the vicinity of  latitude,  longitude)
or
 (in the vicinity of )
 please indicate their position, TRUE course, and speed?
or
2. When directed to a single station:
 Please indicate your position, TRUE course, and speed. 
|-
|QUO*
| Shall I search for  
{|
  |-
  | 1. aircraft
  |-
  | 2. ship
  |-
  | 3. survival craft
  |}
in the vicinity of  latitude,  longitude (or according to any other indication)? 
| Please search for  
{|
  |-
  | 1. aircraft
  |-
  | 2. ship
  |-
  | 3. survival craft
  |}
in the vicinity of  latitude,  longitude (or according to any other indication). 
|-
|QUP 
|Will you indicate your position by
{|
  |-
  | 1. searchlight
  |-
  | 2. black smoke trail
  |-
  | 3. pyrotechnic lights?
  |}
|My position is indicated by
{|
  |-
  | 1. searchlight
  |-
  | 2. black smoke trail
  |-
  | 3. pyrotechnic lights
  |}
|-
|QUQ 
|Shall I train my searchlight nearly vertical on a cloud, occulting if possible and, if your aircraft is seen, deflect the beam up wind and on the water (or land) to facilitate your landing? 
|Please train your searchlight on a cloud, occulting if possible and, if my aircraft is seen or heard, deflect the beam up wind and on the water (or land) to facilitate my landing. 
|-
|QUR*
| Have survivors .
{|
  |-
  | 1. received survival equipment
  |-
  | 2. been picked up by rescue vessel
  |-
  | 3. been reached by ground rescue party?
  |}
| Survivors .
{|
  |-
  |-
  | 2.  have been picked up by a rescue vessel
  |-
  | 3. have been reached by a   ground rescue party
  |}
|-
|QUS*
|Have you sighted survivors or wreckage? If so, in what position? 
|Have sighted .
{|
  |-
  | 1. survivors in water
  |-
  | 2. survivors on rafts
  |-
  | 3. wreckage   at position  latitude,  longitude   (or according to any other indication)
  |}
|-
|QUT*
|Is position of incident marked? 
{|
  |-
  | 1. flame or smoke float
  |-
  | 2. sea marker
  |-
  | 3. sea marker dye
  |-
  | 4.  (specify other marking)
  |} 
|-
|QUU*
|Shall I home ship or aircraft to my position? 
|Home ship or aircraft  (call sign) .
{|
  |-
  | 1. to your position by transmitting your   call sign and long dashes   on  kHz (or MHz)
  |-
  | 2. by transmitting on  kHz (or MHz)   TRUE track to reach you.
  |} 
|-
|QUW*
|-
|QUX 
|Do you have any navigational warnings or gale warnings in force? 
|I have the following navigational warning(s) or gale warning(s) in force: . 
|-
|QUY*
|Is position of survival craft marked? 
{|
  |-
  | 1. flame or smoke float
  |-
  | 2. sea marker
  |-
  | 3. sea marker dye
  |-
  | 4.  (specify other marking)
  |} 
|-
|QUZ 
|May I resume restricted working?
|Distress phase still in force; restricted working may be resumed. 
|}

Amateur radio
Amateur radio has adapted two different sets of Q-codes for use in amateur communications. The first set comes from the ITU civil series QRA through QUZ. Most of the meanings are identical to the ITU definitions, however, they must be looked at in the context of amateur communications. For example, QSJ? asks what the charges are for sending the telegraph. Since amateur communications are without charge, this Q-code would not make sense.

The second set is the set of QN Signals, used only in ARRL NTS nets. These operating signals generally have no equivalent in the ACP 131 publication or ITU publications, and are specifically defined only for use in ARRL NTS nets. They are not used in casual amateur radio communications.

Selected Q-codes were soon adopted by amateur radio operators. In December 1915, the American Radio Relay League began publication of a magazine titled QST, named after the Q-code for "General call to all stations". In amateur radio, the Q-codes were originally used in Morse code transmissions to shorten lengthy phrases and were followed by a Morse code question mark (··— —··) if the phrase was a question.

Q-codes are commonly used in voice communications as shorthand nouns, verbs, and adjectives making up phrases. For example, an amateur radio operator will complain about QRM (man-made interference), or tell another operator that there is "QSB on the signal" (fading); "to QSY" is to change your operating frequency, or to break in on a conversation QSK is often used even on VHF and UHF frequencies. (See also Informal usage, below.)

Q-codes as adapted for use in amateur radio

Notes for response to radiotelegraph Q-codes
Responses to a radiotelegraph Q-code query or a Q-code assertion may vary depending upon the code. For Q-code assertions or queries which only need to be acknowledged as received, the usual practice is to respond with the letter "R" for "Roger" which means "Received correctly". Sending an "R" merely means the code has been correctly received and does not necessarily mean that the receiving operator has taken any other action.

For Q-code queries that need to be answered in the affirmative, the usual practice is to respond with the letter "C" (Sounds like the Spanish word "Si"). For Q-code queries that need to be answered in the negative, the usual practice it to respond with the letter "N" for "no". For those Q-code assertions that merely need to be acknowledged as understood, the usual practice is to respond with the prosign  (or ) which means "understood". On telegraph cable networks "KK" was often used at the end of a reply to a Q-code to mean "OK" or "Acknowledged". This practice predates amateur radio as telegraph operators in the late 19th century are known to have used it.

Informal usage

QLF – "Are you sending with your left foot? Try sending with your left foot!"  A humorously derogatory comment about the quality of a person's sending.

QNB – QNB? “How many buttons on your radio?” “QNB 100/5” Means there are 100 and I know what 5 of them do.

QSH – "Stay happy and healthy."

QSK – "I can hear you during my transmission" – refers to a particular mode of Morse code operating often called QSK operation (full break-in) in which the receiver is quickly enabled during the spaces between the dits and dahs, which allows another operator to interrupt transmissions. Many modern transceivers incorporate this function, sometimes referred to as full break-in as against semi-break-in in which there is a short delay before the transceiver goes to receive.

QSY – "Change to transmission on another frequency"; colloquially, "move [=change address]". E.g., "When did GKB QSY from Northolt to Portishead?"

QTH – "My location is "; colloquially in voice or writing, "location". E.g., "The OCF [antenna type] is an interesting build but at my QTH a disappointing performer."

QTHR – "At the registered location "; chiefly British use. Historically, the location in the printed Callbook; modernly, "as given in online government records for my callsign". E.g., "You can contact me QTHR".

German use during World War II
During World War II, according to Bletchley Park’s General Report on Tunny, German radio teleprinter networks used Q-codes to establish and maintain circuit connections.

In particular: QKP [ought to be 'QEP', not 'QKP' - the print in the source document isn't very clear] was to indicate the Lorenz cipher machine setting for each message and, QZZ to indicate that the daily key change was about to take place at the sender's station.

See also 
 ACP-131
 NOTAM Code
 Amateur radio
 Brevity code
 International Code of Signals
 International maritime signal flags
 Morse code
 Prosigns for Morse code
 QRA locator
 QSK operation (full break-in)
 Ten-code
 Z code

Footnotes

References

External links
 Easy to Read Code Graphic
 
 
 
 
 
 
 
 

Amateur radio
Encodings
Morse code
Operating signals
Telecommunications-related introductions in 1909